Timothy ("Tim") Mark Vanni (born February 2, 1961 in Van Nuys, California) is a two-time U.S. Olympic wrestler. He finished fourth in the '88 Games in Seoul and fifth in the '92 Games in Barcelona.  Vanni also has six world championships placings, and is a five-time Senior U.S. national champion.

He is currently a physical education teacher and wrestling coach for Porterville High School in Porterville, California. He married Karen Cronin in 2002.

References
 Wrestling Hall of Fame
 Olympic USA
 sports-reference
 PHS Staff Directory

Living people
1961 births
Wrestlers at the 1988 Summer Olympics
Wrestlers at the 1992 Summer Olympics
American male sport wrestlers
Olympic wrestlers of the United States
Sportspeople from Los Angeles
People from Van Nuys, Los Angeles
Pan American Games silver medalists for the United States
Pan American Games bronze medalists for the United States
Pan American Games medalists in wrestling
Wrestlers at the 1987 Pan American Games
Wrestlers at the 1991 Pan American Games
Wrestlers at the 1995 Pan American Games
Medalists at the 1987 Pan American Games
Medalists at the 1991 Pan American Games
Medalists at the 1995 Pan American Games